Shawn D. Baldwin (born February 26, 1966) is in federal prison for defrauding investors of $10,000,000 from 2006-2017. He was an international financier, trader and investor. He was the chairman of AIA Group (AIA), an alternative investment firm based in Chicago, prior to being indicted for defrauding multiple investors from 2006-2017.

Biography
Baldwin received a bachelor's degree from Antioch University. He later studied at the University of Oxford's Saïd Business School, where he received an M.F.S.

Professional career

Headquartered in Chicago, Baldwin's Capital Management Group (CMG) was formed through the acquisition of several companies.  First, Baldwin acquired in November 2001 MuniDirect, a broker-dealer based in Atlanta, Georgia.  In December of that same year, Baldwin bought KCM Capital Management, a broker-dealer based in Anguilla but headquartered in Chicago. He also gained control of the Stature Multi-Allocation Fund, a hedge fund worth $56 million. From 2002 to 2005, CMG participated in over 75 transactions for a par of over $68 billion in equity and debt transactions, which included Google and The Travelers Companies.

In December 2006, the National Association of Securities Dealers (later renamed to Financial Industry Regulatory Authority) expelled CMG and Baldwin, preventing the company from continuing its trade activities. The expulsion and bar were overturned by FINRA adjudicators in a January 2009 decision in which they cited "contradictory" statements by the regulators. Baldwin and CMG were given a $25,000 fine and two-year suspension for not fully responding in which he did not submit a deposit ticket for a wire and a bank statement for a brokerage account. This $25,000 fine made him file for bankruptcy that same year.

February 26, 2019 he was indicted by a federal jury after he swindled at least fifteen investors and lenders out of a collective $10,000,000. Baldwin’s fraud scheme began in 2006 and continued until 2017 and occurred when owned and controlled various investment firms in Chicago. He exaggerated his financial success and professional connections to fraudulently obtain more than $10 million from at least 15 investors and lenders.  Baldwin falsely claimed that their funds would be invested in stocks and other investment products, when in reality he spent the money for his own personal benefit. He is currently incarcerated in federal prison in Chicago.

On Monday, October 18, 2021, Baldwin was sentenced to 17 years in federal prison for his financial crime by U.S. District Judge John Robert Blakey after a hearing in federal court in Chicago.

Media coverage and distinctions
Baldwin has been profiled in many magazines, including The Economist, BusinessWeek, Forbes, Fortune, Money, and Investment Dealers' Digest, and has appeared on a number of television networks, including Bloomberg, CNN, CNBC, NBC, and CBS. Investment Dealers' Digest named him one of the Top 40 Investment Bankers under 40. In 2006, Baldwin was named one of the Top 75 Blacks on Wall Street by Black Enterprise. He is a contributor to the financial articles of Fast Company and Forbes. In 2006, Baldwin was the financial spokesperson for BlackBerry and the subject of commercials and a print campaign that ran in Forbes, Fortune and BusinessWeek. Baldwin has been also quoted in The Wall Street Journal.

References

External links
 Official website

Living people
1966 births
Alumni of Saïd Business School
American financiers
American investors
Antioch College alumni
Businesspeople from Dayton, Ohio